Castro Creek is a creek in Richmond, California, in the western part of the city adjacent to the Chevron Oil Refinery. Wildcat Creek drains into it directly and though other Wildcat Marsh tributaries into Castro Cove of San Pablo Bay. The creek drains from the drainage basin of the surrounding area and was once part of the channel that separated the island of Point Richmond with the mainland.

Name

The stream is waterway is named after Don Víctor Castro the owner of the area when it was Rancho San Pablo.

Description
The Chevron Richmond Refinery dumps wastewater into the creek routinely 500 yards north of the confluence with Wildcat Creek and also in a drainage. Other waste may only be dumped into the creek through a drainage ditch on Castro Street during high intensity rainfall. Castro Creek is a fishing, shell-fishing, and recreation area. Its estuarine habitat is essential habitat for several endangered species. The creek is also a fish spawning and migration center. Castro Cove has become very polluted from 85 years of unbridled discharge of waste waters with PAHs and mercury from the Chevron Oil Refinery and is scheduled to begin cleanup efforts in summer 2007.

See also
Castro Cove
Cerrito Creek - marked the southern border of Castro's ranch
List of watercourses in the San Francisco Bay Area

Notes

Bodies of water of Richmond, California
Rivers of Contra Costa County, California
Rivers of Northern California
Tributaries of San Pablo Bay